SR Fernsehen is a regional public service television channel owned and operated by Saarländischer Rundfunk (SR) and serving Saarland. It is one of the seven regional "third programmes" that are offered within the federal ARD network.

The channel, which is organized in cooperation with SWR Fernsehen of the neighboring Südwestrundfunk (SWR), started on 1 September 1998.

Logos

References

External links
 

Saarländischer Rundfunk
ARD (broadcaster)
Television stations in Germany
Television channels and stations established in 1998
1998 establishments in Germany
Mass media in Saarbrücken
German-language television stations